Capitijubatus is a genus of beetles in the family Buprestidae, containing the following species:

 Capitijubatus natalicus (Peringuey, 1908)
 Capitijubatus nickerli (Obenberger, 1922)

References

Buprestidae genera